Liolaemus chehuachekenk is a species of lizard in the family  Liolaemidae. It is native to Argentina.

References

chehuachekenk
Reptiles described in 2008
Reptiles of Argentina
Taxa named by Luciano Javier Ávila
Taxa named by Mariana Morando
Taxa named by Jack W. Sites Jr.